This is a list of churches in the Roman Catholic Diocese of Columbus.  The diocese divides the parishes occupying these church buildings into deaneries for administrative purposes.

List of Churches

Center-South Columbus Deanery

Northwest Columbus Deanery

North High Columbus Deanery

Northland Columbus Deanery

West Columbus Deanery

East Columbus Deanery

Marion Columbus Deanery

Muskingum-Perry Deanery

Knox-Licking Deanery

Tuscarawas-Holmes-Coshocton Deanery

Fairfield-Hocking-Pickaway Deanery

Southern Deanery

References 

Churches in the Roman Catholic Diocese of Columbus
Columbus